Racinaea crispa is a plant  species in the genus Racinaea.

Cultivars
 x Racindsia 'La Mano Magica'

References
BSI Cultivar Registry Retrieved 11 October 2009

crispa